The Adventures of Algy is a 1925 Australian film comedy from director Beaumont Smith about a "silly ass" Englishman (Claude Dampier) who inherits a sheep station in New Zealand. It is an unofficial follow up to Hullo Marmaduke (1924), which also starred Dampier.

Unlike most of Smith's silent films, most of the movie survives today.

Plot
Algy (Claude Dampier) is an Englishman who travels to New Zealand to claim a sheep station he has inherited. He falls in love with a neighbour, Kiwi McHill (Bathie Stuart), then travels to Australia. He runs into Kiwi again, using dances she has learned from her Māori friends in a Sydney revue. When he returns to New Zealand he strikes oil on his farm and he and Kiwi are married.

Cast
Claude Dampier as Algernon Allison
Bathie Stuart as Kiwi McGill
Eric Harrison as Murray Watson
Billie Carlyle as Mollie Moore
George Chalmers as John McGill
Lester Brown as stage manager
Eric Yates
Beaumont Smith
Hilda Attenboro
Verna Blain

Production
The Adventures of Algy was shot on location in New Zealand and Sydney during the early part of 1925. New Zealand locations included Wellington, Auckland, Christchurch, Dunedin, Taranaki, and Rotarua  (notably the hot springs). Exterior locations in Sydney included Martin Place, Circular Quay, Watson's Bay Gap, the Palace Theatre, and Sydney Harbour (aboard the ferry Kubu). The scene at the Gap focused on a sensational aspect of the story whereby a young girl attempts to throw herself over the cliff. Interior filming took place at Australasian Films' Rushcutters Bay studio. As with Smith and Dampier's previous film, Hullo Marmaduke, The Adventures of Algy was given a joint world premiere at Sydney's Lyric Wintergarden and Lyceum theatres.

Dampier later married his co-star, Billie Carlyle.

Reception
Reviews for the film were generally positive. Film writers Andrew Pike and Ross Cooper wrote that:
The film... reveals a heavy reliance on titles to propel the insubstantial plot along, and frequently the images are little more than illustrations for the printed text.
Smith was becoming exhausted with film production and concentrated on distribution and exhibition instead over the next eight years. He returned to directing with The Hayseeds (1933).

References

External links
The Adventures of Algy in the Internet Movie Database
The Adventures of Algy at the National Film and Sound Archive
The Adventures of Algy at the New Zealand Feature Project

1925 films
Australian comedy films
Australian silent feature films
Films directed by Beaumont Smith
Australian black-and-white films
1926 comedy films
1926 films
American black-and-white films
American silent feature films
1925 comedy films
Silent American comedy films
1920s American films